Alexander Keith Jr. (1827 – 1875), known as William King Thomas, was an American Civil War spy for the Confederate States of America. He used a time bomb to attempt to destroy the ship Mosel for insurance fraud.

Biography 
Keith was born in 1827 in Caithness, Scotland, immigrating to Halifax, Nova Scotia when he was a small boy. The nephew of Halifax businessman Alexander Keith, he worked for a time as a clerk in his uncle's brewery.  Apparently envious of the wealthier life his uncle lived, Keith Jr. was determined to make a name for himself by any means necessary.  He began by scamming railroads by delivering cheap product instead of the expensive products he promised. During the American Civil War, when Halifax was home to many Confederate sympathizers, Keith acted mostly as a blockade runner and courier. He helped a Confederate sympathiser escape British capture in the Chesapeake Affair. He was also involved with Luke Blackburn in a plot to send clothes infected with yellow fever to northern cities in the United States.  In 1865, he swindled his associates-in-crime and fled to St. Louis, Missouri, settling finally on the prairie. There, he married Cecelia Paris, a milliner's daughter from St. Louis.

Hunted down by one of his victims, with Cecelia again Keith fled, this time to Germany. He hobnobbed with wealthy socialites and Saxon generals under the assumed name of "William King Thomas". When the couple began to run out of money, remembering a series of fraudulent insurance claims on blockade-running ships that sank at sea, Keith eventually determined to just destroy a ship himself.  Using a variety of aliases, he set about purchasing timers and dynamite.  He obtained around 150 British pounds of insurance for what he claimed was a barrel of caviar to complete his scheme. His initial target was a Norddeutscher Lloyd  ship, the Mosel. This led to a major catastrophe in Bremerhaven in 1875, when a time bomb he had placed in the "caviar" barrel accidentally went off on the dock, killing 81 people. According to one witness: "A mushroom-shaped column of smoke rose approximately 200 meters above the harbor. Everywhere people were crying and whimpering beside ruins. The entire pier was covered in soot: it was like the gateway to hell." At the time, the deed was called the "crime of the century."

Keith was aboard another ship in Bremerhaven at the time of the Mosel explosion. He went to his suite and shot himself twice with a revolver, but survived for a week. After the tragedy was revealed as a murder/insurance scam on a large scale, the disappearances of other ships were investigated to see if Keith and his possible associates were involved. One was the disappearance of the SS City of Boston, which vanished in January 1870. The allegation was proven to be false. He was reputed to have been buried in an unmarked grave in Bremerhaven. His severed head was kept at the Bremer Police Museum and was destroyed by Allied bombing in 1945. Newspapers called it "The Thomas Crime."

Regarding his time bomb, Keith's biographer Ann Larabee wrote: "Keith was not responsible for the political passion of these violent political groups, but he played a role in showing them a means of action."

In Fiction 
The Dynamite Fiend by Ann Larabee brings to light the stunning story behind Alexander Keith Jr.

Alexander Keith Jr. is a character in Boris Pronsky and Craig Britton's novel Forty-Ninth, central for the execution of the Alaska Payment Conspiracy in their book. Alexander Keith Jr. is introduced by the name of William Thompson, as it was one of the many aliases used by Alexander Keith Jr.

References

Sources

External links
The Dynamite Fiend

1827 births
1875 deaths
1870s suicides
Canadian smugglers
Scottish emigrants to pre-Confederation Nova Scotia
People from Caithness
People from Halifax, Nova Scotia
Canadian mass murderers
Scottish mass murderers
Suicides by firearm in Germany
Multiple gunshot suicides